Mouassine is a district within the Medina of Marrakech neighbouring the districts of Bab Doukkala, Azbezt, Derb Tizougarine and Riad Aitoun El Kedim. The area contains the Mouassine Mosque, the Mouassine Fountain (part of the mosque complex), and the Dar el Bacha Palace.

The area acts as one of the main gateways to the souks and is a relatively affluent area of the medina (old city).

Name 
Like the name Marrakech which is derived from the Tamazight language to mean the land of God  the name for the district of Mouassine is likely to have Tamazight origins but the meaning is unclear. In the 1930s the district had a spelling that was closer to the phonetic sound and was written Mwasin. When the city of Marrakech was established in 1061 the district was known as Houmat Abi Abidan but during Marrakech’s renaissance in the 16th century under its Saadian rulers the name changed to Mouassine.

History 

Up until the reign of Abdellah El Ghalib Jews were relatively dispersed through the city but the area of Mouassine housed a significant concentration of them and was generally regarded as an ancient Jewish quarter. When Abdallah El Ghalib came to power in 1557 he used the opportunity to re-landscape Marrakech as a symbol of his authority and part of this was to relocate the Jewish community into the new Mellah area. Up until this massive re-landscaping Mouassine was regarded as one of the two ancient Jewish areas. The most famous landmark in Mouassine is the Mouassine Mosque commissioned by Sultan Abdellah. The construction of the mosque was part of a major redevelopment of the area and was located upon the site of a former Jewish cemetery. The mosque, also known as Jami' al-Ashraf is part of a larger complex that includes a library, hamman, madrasa and the famous Mouassine Fountain, one of the most famous in the medina.

The current configuration of Mouassine thus dates back to the Saadian period, and its redevelopment at this time enticed a relatively large number of bourgeois or aristocratic families to build their residences here. This has resulted in a concentration of structures dating from the Saadian period located in this area, with examples of Saadian-era houses including the Dar Cherifa (formerly Dar Ijimi), the Dar al-Mas'udiyyin, and the Dar al-Masluhiyyin (known also as Ksour Agafay). Some of these houses today have been converted into cafés, restaurants, and hotels. Also notable is the douiria (an upper-floor apartment for receiving guests) in what is now the Mouassine Museum. This house, recently restored to reveal its original wood and stucco ornamentation, dates back to the Saadian period but also features decorative motifs from the time of Sultan Moulay Ismail (1672–1727).

Economy 
Mouassine is one of the most upmarket areas of the Medina containing a number of the highest rated riads in the whole of Morocco. Riad Snan 13, Dar Mo’da, Riad Al-Bushra, Riad El-Zohar, and Riad L’Orangerie were all in Trip Advisor’s top 25 in 2014.

Additionally there are a number of stores that offer top quality Moroccan produce and export their produce around the world. La Maison du Kaftan Marocain, Maktoub, Kif Kif, and Kulchi all have their home in Mouassine. The area seems to successfully fuse the traditional with the contemporary and remains an important gateway to the souks.

References

Neighborhoods of Marrakesh